Peter Cornelius (4 January 1865 in Asminderød – 30 December 1934 in Snekkersten) was a Danish opera singer.

Biography
Born in 1865, Cornelius made his professional opera debut at the Royal Danish Theatre in 1892 as baritone in the role of Escamillo in Georges Bizet's Carmen. He was a member of that theatre until his retirement from the stage in 1922. In 1899, he began performing tenor roles while still performing many roles from the baritone repertoire. After 1902 he was heard frequently in the leading Wagnerian heldentenor parts such as Lohengrin, Parsifal, Siegfried, Siegmund, Walther, Tannhäuser and Tristan. He appeared as a guest artist with major opera houses throughout Europe.

References

1865 births
1934 deaths
Danish operatic tenors
Operatic baritones
19th-century Danish male opera singers
People from Fredensborg Municipality